The Battle of Kansas (also known as the "Battle of Wichita") was the nickname given to a project to build, modify, and deliver large quantities of the world's most advanced bomber to the front-lines, originally in Europe and also in  the Pacific, although because of delays in production, it was used only in the Pacific. The battle began as the first B-29 Superfortresses rolled off the production lines of the massive new Boeing factory on the prairies near Wichita, Kansas.

The Boeing B-29 Superfortress was a significant advance in aviation technology, which came with a multitude of problems to be resolved before it was suitable for combat operations. When the B-29 was ordered into production, the Japanese attack on Pearl Harbor had not yet taken place and the first flight of the XB-29 prototype was still over a year away. On 6 September 1941 the US Army Air Forces placed its initial production contract for 250 B-29s, built mainly in Wichita, KS.

Background
In early 1941 the Boeing Wichita factory (which was intended to become one of the main assembly plants for "Project 345") was building PT-13D & N2S-5 "Kaydet" biplane trainers for the USAAF and the USN respectively, as well as B-17 control surfaces. The plant needed massive expansion to build the new bomber so on June 24, 1941, new ground was broken for what was to become "Plant II", which was to be completed in January 1943. New equipment was already being installed by Boeing six months before final completion. Also needed was a whole army of factory workers: people were recruited from all over Kansas and neighboring states. Accommodation for all of them needed to be found. Few of them had any experience in aircraft assembly and a large scale training program was required: they were expected to build a new type of aircraft.

At the same time as the new factory was being built the USAAF started forming the foundations of four "Bombardment Groups" (the 40th, 444th, 462nd, and 468th BGs.) Together they made up the 58th Bombardment Wing (58th BW), which was the first operational unit to take the B-29 into combat from as yet un-built bases in China. A fifth BG, the 472nd was also formed as an operational training unit: this Group stayed in the U.S. and was disbanded in April 1944.

With its new wing design, new type of remote controlled armament, pressurized crew stations, and powerful new Wright R-3350 radial engines (with new, 16 ft (4.88 m) diameter, slow-turning Hamilton Standard propellers), the B-29 project was unprecedented in the history of aviation: from inception, to drawing board and mass production took three years, at a time when such a design should have taken five years just to become a prototype. Instead the engineering design, production, and testing were being undertaken simultaneously, with all of the expected and unexpected problems, starting from the time the first XB-29 (41-1002) took to the air on 21 September 1942. The USAAF under General Hap Arnold envisaged thousands of B-29s, and they wanted at least 175 of them as soon as possible. The Wichita factory started producing components, then a run of 14 YB-29s in early 1943, before starting on building production aircraft by the autumn.

Soon after the fatal crash of the second prototype, USAAF Colonel Harman came up with a plan to coordinate the process of working the "bugs" out of the new aircraft, especially the engines. The objective was to take control of the entire B-29 program of production, aircraft modification, flight tests, and training. Approval for the "B-29 Special Project" came directly from President Roosevelt, who had been advised by General Arnold. In spite of this directive the B-29 program was to run into trouble.

The battle
By Mid January 1944, 97 B-29s had been built by Wichita. Unfortunately only 16 of these were flyable with most of them grounded at "Modification Centers" 
or on the  1,626,100 sq ft (151,070 sq m) parking/delivery apron at the Wichita plant pending urgent modification.  The basic design of the B-29 was sound, but significant shortcuts had been taken in the rush to get it into service, causing numerous defects and quality problems. The Boeing-run organization, which should have been getting the B-29s ready for battle, collapsed under the strain.

The biggest headaches were caused by the new R-3350 engines, which were constantly overheating. Other problems arose with defective pressure seals around the cockpit windows and sighting blisters, which needed precise fitting to avoid leakage. Also causing problems were the sighting systems (four analog computers) for the remote controlled defensive armament, as well as the turrets themselves. Then came electrical failures, caused by faulty Cannon plugs, which supplied connections throughout the ten miles (16 km) of wiring in each B-29. Sub-standard glass in the cockpit transparencies meant the pilots had problems due to the distortion. A minor "beef-up" was found to be needed on the wing structures.

Along with the main problems, constant alterations to other components were needed as the Army changed requirements and as updated components from external suppliers replaced those already in use. Finally, in June 1942 an extra complication was added when it was decided to use the Boeing-Wichita plant to build 750 CG-4 Waco gliders. As a result, the first production B-29s that rolled off the lines at Wichita were virtually hand built. It was discovered that there were some surprising weight differences from one plane to the next: this was caused by commercial weight tolerances in raw materials and because of the cumulative effects of small tolerances in the assembly process.

General Hap Arnold's demands

When General Arnold visited the Wichita Plant on 11 January 1944 he wanted 175 combat ready B-29s for the XX Bomber Command. As he was shown around the assembly lines he picked out the 175th fuselage section and signed it commenting: "This is the plane I want. I want it before the First of March."
When he discovered two months later that no B-29s were actually combat ready, and that some had been sitting waiting for parts for two months or more Arnold was livid. In March 1944 General Bennett Meyers was given full authority to act under Arnold's name to get the B-29s modified and combat ready. Specialist USAAF ground crew and technicians were called in from all over the country and 600 workers were pulled from the Wichita assembly lines. Subcontractors were told to stop all work on non-B-29 components until they had fulfilled their commitments.

With the thermometer often reading below zero the 1,200 technicians who had gathered at the Wichita factory and the Modification Centers were being asked to modify each bomber inside and out. First, the wings needed to have some of the plating removed, the required "beef-ups" were added, and then each piece of skin riveted back in place. At the same time, the cowl flaps, which controlled airflow through and around the troublesome engines, were being modified. Each piece of glass installed in the nose had to be pulled out and replaced with new distortion free panes. After that, the pressurization had to be rechecked: 75 B-29s in total needed new glass. Internally every electrical plug had to be removed, disassembled, and resoldered – a total of 586,000 connections in completed aircraft, plus those on the assembly lines and in wiring harnesses ready for installation.

A lot of the work was being done in the middle of the frequent snow-storms: it was so cold crews could only work for 20 minutes at a time, with most of the jobs requiring delicate handling.

Wright Duplex Cyclone engines improved
One major challenge was pulling all of the Wright R-3350-23 Duplex-Cyclone radial engines out of already completed B-29s and modifying them to R-3350-23A "war engine" standard. This entailed disassembling and rebuilding the engines with added baffles to accelerate the airflow over the cylinders, new exhaust valves with improved metallurgy, new rocker arms (drilled with small holes, to allow better oil flow, rather than solid), and modified nose casings and engine sumps, again to improve oil flow. In sub-zero temperatures the work was arduous, especially when it came to struggling with stiff and brittle fuel and oil lines and hard-to-reach clamps, bolts, and screws.

Other necessary modifications, apart from those already described, were replacing the rudders with strengthened units, all main landing gear tires were replaced, and the main gear leg structures reinforced. APQ-13 radar sets had to be fitted. Finally, long range fuel tanks were installed in the bomb bays.

After about five weeks of exhausting work the first combat-ready B-29s started taking off on the first leg of the long journey to China. General Arnold had won the "Battle of Kansas" and was getting his 175 combat-ready Superfortresses.

References

Bibliography
 Phillips, Ed. "Boeing's Battle of Wichita". Airpower Volume 11, No 4. July 1981.
 Birdsall, Steve. Saga of the Superfortress: The dramatic story of the B-29 and the Twentieth Air Force. London: Sidgewick & Jackson, 1981 
 Boeing B-29 Superfortress (Crowood Aviation Series) by Steve Pace. The Crowood Press Ltd, 2003, p39-40.

External links
 Kansas State Historical Society: Battle of Kansas
 Boeing Logbook: 1943–1945 Battle of Kansas, March 10, 1944
 Tails Through Time: The Battle of Kansas saves the B-29

United States Army Air Forces
United States home front during World War II
History of Wichita, Kansas
Economy of Wichita, Kansas
1943 in Kansas
1944 in Kansas
Boeing B-29 Superfortress